In mathematics, a positive polynomial (respectively non-negative polynomial) on a particular set is a polynomial whose values are positive (respectively non-negative) on that set. Precisely, Let p be a polynomial in n variables with real coefficients and let S be a subset of the n-dimensional Euclidean space ℝn. We say that:
 p is positive on S if p(x) > 0 for every x in S.
 p is non-negative on S if p(x) ≥ 0 for every x in S.

Positivstellensatz (and nichtnegativstellensatz) 
For certain sets S, there exist algebraic descriptions of all polynomials that are positive (resp. non-negative) on S.  Such a description is a positivstellensatz (resp. nichtnegativstellensatz). The importance of Positivstellensatz theorems in computation arises from its ability to transform problems of polynomial optimization into semidefinite programming problems, which can be efficiently solved using convex optimization techniques.

Examples of positivstellensatz (and nichtnegativstellensatz) 
 Globally positive polynomials and sum of squares decomposition.
 Every real polynomial in one variable and with even degree is non-negative on ℝ if and only if it is a sum of two squares of real polynomials in one variable.  This equivalence does not generalize for polynomial with more than one variable: for instance, the Motzkin polynomial X 4Y 2 + X 2Y 4 − 3X 2Y 2 + 1 is non-negative on ℝ2 but is not a sum of squares of elements from ℝ[X, Y].
 A real polynomial in n variables is non-negative on ℝn if and only if it is a sum of squares of real rational functions in n variables (see Hilbert's seventeenth problem and Artin's solution).
 Suppose that p ∈ ℝ[X1, ..., Xn] is homogeneous of even degree. If it is positive on ℝn \ {0}, then there exists an integer m such that (X12 + ... + Xn2)m p is a sum of squares of elements from ℝ[X1, ..., Xn].
 Polynomials positive on polytopes.
 For polynomials of degree ≤ 1 we have the following variant of Farkas lemma: If f, g1, ..., gk have degree ≤ 1 and f(x) ≥ 0 for every x ∈ ℝn satisfying g1(x) ≥ 0, ..., gk(x) ≥ 0, then there exist non-negative real numbers c0, c1, ..., ck such that f = c0 + c1g1 + ... + ckgk.
 Pólya's theorem: If p ∈ ℝ[X1, ..., Xn] is homogeneous and p is positive on the set {x ∈ ℝn | x1 ≥ 0, ..., xn ≥ 0, x1 + ... + xn ≠ 0}, then there exists an integer m such that (x1 + ... + xn)m p has non-negative coefficients.
 Handelman's theorem: If K is a compact polytope in Euclidean d-space, defined by linear inequalities gi ≥ 0, and if f is a polynomial in d variables that is positive on K, then f can be expressed as a linear combination with non-negative coefficients of products of members of {gi}.
 Polynomials positive on semialgebraic sets.
 The most general result is Stengle's Positivstellensatz.
 For compact semialgebraic sets we have Schmüdgen's positivstellensatz, Putinar's positivstellensatz and Vasilescu's positivstellensatz. The point here is that no denominators are needed.
 For nice compact semialgebraic sets of low dimension, there exists a nichtnegativstellensatz without denominators.

Generalizations of positivstellensatz 
Positivstellensatz also exist for signomials, trigonometric polynomials, polynomial matrices, polynomials in free variables, quantum polynomials, and definable functions on o-minimal structures.

References
 Bochnak, Jacek; Coste, Michel; Roy, Marie-Françoise. Real Algebraic Geometry. Translated from the 1987 French original. Revised by the authors. Ergebnisse der Mathematik und ihrer Grenzgebiete (3) [Results in Mathematics and Related Areas (3)], 36. Springer-Verlag, Berlin, 1998. x+430 pp. .
 Marshall, Murray. "Positive polynomials and sums of squares". Mathematical Surveys and Monographs, 146. American Mathematical Society, Providence, RI, 2008. xii+187 pp. , .

Notes

See also 
 Polynomial SOS
Hilbert's seventeenth problem
Hilbert's Nullstellensatz for algebraic descriptions of polynomials that are zero on a set S.

Real algebraic geometry